Róbert Hajšel (born 28 March 1967) is a Slovak politician who was elected as a Member of the European Parliament in 2019.

References

Living people
MEPs for Slovakia 2019–2024
Direction – Social Democracy MEPs
Direction – Social Democracy politicians
1967 births